Cryogenic seals provide a mechanical containment mechanism for materials held at cryogenic temperatures, such as cryogenic fluids. Various techniques, including soldering and welding are available for creating seals; however, specialized materials and processes are necessary to hermetically entrap cryogenic constituents under vacuum-tight conditions. Most commonly used are liquid helium and liquid nitrogen, which boil at very low temperatures, below −153 °C (120 K), as well as hydrocarbons with low freezing points and refrigerating mixtures. Pure indium wire or solder preform washers are accepted as the most reliable low temperature sealing materials. When correctly formed, indium will afford leak rates of less than 4.0x10 -9 mbar- liter/sec. Alternative cryogenic seal materials include silicone grease conical seals, and Pb/Sn (lead-tin) wire seals.

History
Fundamental cryogenic processing began in the 1940s, albeit primitive. Steel cutting tools were immersed in liquid nitrogen to enhance their service life.

Mechanical processes utilizing cryogenics were documented well in the 1950s and by the 1980s cryogenic fluids began to be considered for storage and use in modern devices.

Today, cryogenic seals are a necessity in high-tech commercial, medical, and military applications to encapsulate the cryogenic fluids critical for device resolution and function.

Applications
Applications which utilize cryogenic seals include:
Magnetic resonance imaging (MRI)
Chromatography
Dilution Refrigeration Units
Cooled Detectors
Optical Windows
Infrared Detectors
Centrifugal Cryogenic Pumps
Unmanned Aerial Vehicle Systems
Missile Warning Receivers
Satellite Tracking Systems
Infrared Telescopes

Indium seals

Advantages
Advantages of indium cryogenic seals:
Established/proven design techniques for indium seal assembly
Option for disassembly and re-assembly
Indium can be reformed into useful seals after use
Soft and pliable at room temperature, due to the low melting temperature of indium, so it fills imperfections. This creates an impervious bond between the mating surfaces, crafting a hermetic seal which remains malleable at cryogenic temperatures
Seal integrity remains following thermal shock from room temperature to immersion in cryogenic bath 
Seal quality is independent of the mating surface composition, for instance ceramic, germanium, metal, or glass. 
Indium forms a self-passivating oxide layer, 80-100Ǻ thick. This layer is easy to remove with an acid etch, and the underlying, exposed indium metal can be compressed to form a tight, hermetic bond.

Disadvantages
Bulky mechanical structure required to compress indium between the flanges.
Pulsating loads cause creep of indium seals, which loosens the bolt tension, thereby reducing the quality of the seal.

Process information for indium seals
Mating surfaces should be kept as clean as possible, and may be cleaned using acetone. 
Clean, oxide-free indium will cold weld to itself. The mating ends of a wire seal will weld together under compression. 
 A more reliable alternative to a seal made from indium wire is a seal that uses an indium washer. Washers minimize the risk of seal degradation and cryogenic leaks by eliminating the interface between connected butt ends of wire. Washers are manufactured as a continuous ring with no breaks. 
As many fasteners as possible should be used to clamp the indium seal.
Indium material used must be ultra-pure (99.9 minimum purity) to prevent hardening of the material at sub-zero temperatures, as well as to restrict impurities of elements with low vapor-pressure.
Material used for indium cryogenic seals should be manufactured from vacuum-cast material to prevent outgassing after fixturing in the assembly.

Reliability testing
Helium leak tests
Cryogenic temperature shock testing

Types
Compact indium seal
Compressible hermetic seal
Compression seal
Cryogenic vacuum seal
Demountable cryogenic seal
Indium cryogenic vacuum seal
Indium o-ring flange seals
Indium seal
Indium wire o-ring
Indium wire seal
Low profile indium seal
Low temperature seal
Reusable cryogenic vacuum seal
Reusable indium wire seal
Reusable, low-profile, cryogenic wire seal
Soft metal seal
Vacuum compatible seal
Vacuum compatible seal at cryogenic temperature
Corner joint seal
Face joint seal

Manufacturers
Indium Corporation
CMR-Direct
Garlock Helicoflex
AIM
ESPI Metals
Sealwise
Kapton®
Mylar®
Indium Wire Extrusion

External links
 Physical Constants of Pure Indium
 A reusable, low-profile, cryogenic wire seal
 Corrosion of Indium-Base Solders
 Indium Compressed into Hermetic Seals
 HelioxTL System Operator's Handbook - Generic System Manual
 Cryogenic Society of America, Inc.
 VIDEO showing how to make an indium seal on a cryogenic system

References

Cryogenics